Rashbehari Avenue (earlier known as Main Sewer Road or Ballygunge Avenue) is one of the most prestigious and important east–west avenues of Kolkata, India. A major portion of this road is often commonly referred to as Gariahat, the prime shopping and aristocratic residential neighbourhood of south Kolkata. Rashbehari Avenue falls in the posh residential neighbourhood of Ballygunge. The road is named after Sir Rash Behari Ghosh who was an Indian politician, lawyer, social worker and philanthropist.

Localities 

The Gariahat Market is located on Rashbehari Avenue and Gariahat Road Crossing (Gariahat More). It is best known for its fish offerings. The other three points of the crossing contains a collection of Indian sarees and other items such as readymade garments, electronic gadgets. Besides the regular shops, there are the makeshift shops that crowd the sidewalks.

The main shopping area runs down to its intersection with Sarat Bose Road (Deshapriya Park) but mainly up to Triangular Park. Then it travels further west to meet Shyama Prasad Mukherjee Road (previously Russa Road) at Rashbehari Crossing (Rashbehari More) and heads towards Chetla. From Chetla-Sahanagar Bridge (Shaheed Jatin Das Setu), Rashbehari Avenue becomes Chetla Central Road and moves towards Alipore.

In the east, it meets the Eastern Metropolitan Bypass at Gold Park (Ruby Hospital). This extended part of it starts from the eastern flank of Bijon Setu (Rail Overbridge). The extended part (including Bijon Setu above suburban railways at Ballygunge railway station) till Ruby doesn't bear its original name, but is commonly called the Rashbehari Avenue Connector.

The important traffic intersections from east to west are near Ekdalia (Ballygunge Station stop), Gariahat, Hindustan Park (Ballygunge area), Deshapriya Park (Sarat Bose Road), Lake Market and Rash Behari (Shyama Prasad Mukherjee Road).

The important roads that run immediately parallel to it are Southern Avenue to its south and Hazra Road (now renamed) to its north.

Landmarks

 Lake Mall
 Gariahat Market 
 Deshapriya Park
 Priya Cinema
 Mr. Idli (Triangular Park)

See also
 Rashbehari (Vidhan Sabha constituency)

References

External links

Streets in Kolkata